Gathering of Heroes: Legend of the Seven Swords is a 2018 American science fiction fantasy action film starring Martin Kove, Christopher Atkins and Trygve Lode. It was shot in 4K on the RED ONE digital cinema camera in Colorado, USA.

Plot
In the mystical realm of Ryntia, the forces of the underworld are aligning to unleash a plague of evil upon the surface. The deadly bat-like Blood Reavers, the Goblin Hordes, the Saurian Maurauders, the Orcish Warmongers and the feline Shadowcat mercenaries have pledged their respective clans to the service of Bre'Gwen, queen of the deep elves. Together they seek to destroy the human and Elven kingdoms and rule all of Ryntia in the name of evil.

However even with their combined strength, Bre'Gwen's forces are no match for the powerful Grayraven kingdom led by the majestic king, Garrick Grayraven. To ensure their success, Bre'gwen forges an alliance with an unlikely human who holds the secret to acquiring a powerful artifact that will allow them to summon and control an army of undead warriors from centuries past. Guided by fragmented visions, a mysterious Oracle gathers seven unlikely heroes to face the threat. A heroic knight, a deep elf sorceress, an eccentric bard, a silver elf druid, a righteous paladin, a barbarian huntress, and a brooding thief are the only ones capable of stopping this evil at its source but first they must embark upon a quest to find the legendary seven swords of Draconus.

Cast
 Martin Kove as Galaron the Brave
 Christopher Atkins as King Greyraven
 Trygve Lode as the Oracle
 Mark Steven Grove as Ghar Blackmane
 Debra Marshall as Reina
 Kirk Montgomery as Lord Aurin
 Sam Del Rio as Jeris
 Michelle Dover as Queen Bre'gwen
 Sera N. Salazar as Isabelle
 Lauren Melone as Kyriani
 Lucky McQueede as Shalomin Songsteel
 Brian Cahill as Caldir
 Kristie Griever as Tari

External links
 
 

2018 fantasy films
2010s English-language films
American science fiction action films
American fantasy action films
2010s American films